Trygve Brudevold (19 December 1920 – 19 August 2021) was a Norwegian bobsledder who competed in the 1950s. Competing in two Winter Olympics, he earned his best finish of 11th in the four-man event at Cortina d'Ampezzo in 1956. He was born in Stange. He died in August 2021 at the age of 100.

References

External links
 
1952 bobsleigh four-man results
1956 bobsleigh four-man results
Bobsleigh four-man results: 1948-64.
Trygve Brudevold's profile at Sports Reference.com

1920 births
2021 deaths
Bobsledders at the 1952 Winter Olympics
Bobsledders at the 1956 Winter Olympics
Men centenarians
Norwegian centenarians
Norwegian male bobsledders
Olympic bobsledders of Norway
People from Stange
Sportspeople from Innlandet